Richard Akel (born February 12, 1962) is an American former professional tennis player.

Akel grew up in Little Rock, Arkansas and comes from a family which has origins in Palestine.

A left-handed player, Akel won two state championships during his high school career and played collegiate tennis at Clemson University, where he was a member of three Atlantic Coast Conference championship teams.

On the professional tour he had a best singles world ranking of 345 and appeared in qualifying draws for grand slam tournaments. He reached a career high doubles ranking 182 in the world and won one title at ATP Challenger level.

In 2019 he was an inductee into the Arkansas Sports Hall of Fame.

ATP Challenger titles

Doubles: (1)

References

External links
 
 

1962 births
Living people
American male tennis players
Clemson Tigers men's tennis players
Tennis people from Arkansas
American people of Palestinian descent
Sportspeople from Little Rock, Arkansas